The Bangka Park (also Mangka Park, Mengjia Park and Mengxia Park) is a park in Wanhua District, Taipei, Taiwan.

Name

Mangka Park (from Taiwanese Hokkien) or Mengjia Park (from Mandarin) is a transliteration of the word moungar, a Taiwanese aborigines word for canoe or gathering place for canoe. It is used to be known as Park No. 12.

History
In 1738, the Lungshan Temple of Manka was constructed. In 1923, the land area in front of the temple was forested and named Mengxia Park. In 1956, Taipei Mayor Kao Yu-shu gave permission for street vendors to set up their stalls at the park. Since then, the park became the gathering place for the vendors and homeless people, which resulted a bad and dirty environment around the park. In 1992, Mayor Huang Ta-chou allocated a budget to rejuvenate the area. In 1995, the Department of Rapid Transit Systems held a public competition to carry out the planning and design to rejuvenate the park, which was won by ROW and Associates Architects. Later in an effort to preserve the area, Taipei City Government planned to make urban renewal plan on the temple area, three major squares and lotus pond, and to create culture and art gallery, underground shopping center and underground parking lot. The project was won by Weichuan Construction Company, Kailay Engineering Company, Fure-Lin Engineering Company and China-Ryoden Company. The permit for underground construction was issued in July 1998 and the groundbreaking ceremony was officiated by Mayor Ma Ying-jeou on 24 February 1999. The park was officially opened in a ceremony officiated by Mayor Ma on 22 January 2005.

Architecture
The park features a dragon-shaped fountain.

Transportation
The park is accessible from Longshan Temple Station of Taipei Metro.

See also
 Geography of Taiwan

References

2005 establishments in Taiwan
Parks established in 2005
Parks in Taipei